Hyderabad Football Stadium is a multi-use stadium in Hyderabad, Pakistan.  It is currently used mostly for football matches. The stadium has a seating capacity of about 3,000 spectators.

References

See also
 List of stadiums in Pakistan
 List of cricket grounds in Pakistan
 List of sports venues in Karachi
 List of sports venues in Lahore
 List of sports venues in Faisalabad
 List of stadiums by capacity

Football venues in Pakistan